Jakub Heidenreich (born 27 April 1989) is a Czech former professional footballer who played as a left-back. He represented his country at all age groups from U-16 up to U-21.

References

External links
 
 
 1. FC Tatran Prešov profile  (archived from the original on 13 May 2012)

1989 births
Living people
Czech footballers
People from Mohelnice
Association football fullbacks
Czech Republic youth international footballers
Czech Republic under-21 international footballers
Czech First League players
SK Sigma Olomouc players
1. FC Tatran Prešov players
SV Eichede players
Slovak Super Liga players
Regionalliga players
Czech expatriate sportspeople in Slovakia
Expatriate footballers in Slovakia
Czech expatriate sportspeople in Germany
Expatriate footballers in Germany
Sportspeople from the Olomouc Region